Ka. Mu. Sheriff was a writer and poet who wrote mainly in the Tamil language. He was a popular Tamil film lyricist during the 1950s and 60s. His lyrics Chittukuruvi Chittukuruvi Sedhi Theriyuma?, Yerikaraiyin Maele Poravale Penn Mayile are ever-green in the minds of Tamil film song lovers. He has also written screenplay and dialogues to some films.

Early life
Born on 11 August 1914 at Abhivirutheeswaram in East Thanjavur district as the only son to Kadershah Ravuthar and Pathuma amma, he lived an exemplary life. Though he was a Muslim by birth, he respected other faiths and was a vegetarian throughout his life. He never smoked or drank.

He did not have a regular school education but was tutored privately in Tamil language till he was 14 years of age. Encouraged by his father, he learned Tamil grammar and literature. He started writing poetry when he was young.

Career
He started writing short stories for Ananda Vikatan. (Later these short stories were published as a collection in book form). He published a monthly named "Oli" in 1948 and then between 1952 and 1969 he published two periodicals Saattai and Thamizh Muzhakkam.

Freedom fighter
He was a follower of the Congress party freedom fight and has taken part in the Quit India Movement in 1942. Later he joined Ma. Po. Si.'s Tamil Arasu Kazhagam and functioned as its secretary. He participated in the struggle mooted by Tamil Arasu Kazhagam to retain Madras as the Capital of Tamil Nadu. He also participated in the Anti-Hindi agitations of Tamil Nadu.

Writer
He has written numerous books on various subjects in Tamil. (Lists of books he authored can be found in :ta:கா. மு. ஷெரீப்).

Tamil Movie Lyricist
In late 1940s, Sheriff was affiliated to the Modern Theatres in Salem. He was influential in introducing  M. Karunanidhi to the Modern Theaatres' owner T. R. Sundaram, who hired the young script writer for a monthly sum of 500 rupees, to join the story department of his company. In his autobiography, Karunanidhi had acknowledged this debt. Sheriff has penned more than 400 lyrics, many of which are popular and ever-green among Tamil film song lovers. His very first movie lyric was penned for the 1950 film Ponmudi, produced by the Modern Theatres.

Music Directors
Music Directors who composed tunes to his lyrics are: G. Ramanathan, S. M. Subbaiah Naidu, S. Dakshinamurthi, K. V. Mahadevan, Ramaneekaran, T. A. Kalyanam, T. R. Pappa, S. Rajeswara Rao

Singers
Singers who sang his lyrics include T. M. Soundararajan, M. K. Thyagaraja Bhagavathar, Sirkazhi Govindarajan, A. M. Rajah, P. Leela, Jikki, K. Jamuna Rani, Soolamangalam Jayalakshmi, (Radha) Jayalakshmi, K. Rani, U. R. Chandra, Ponnammal, N. L. Ganasaraswathi, A. P. Komala,

Notable compositions

Death
Ka. Mu. Sheriff died on 7 July 1994.

Bibliography

Kavi Ka. Mu. Sheriff

References

1914 births
1994 deaths
Tamil poets
Tamil writers
Tamil film poets
Indian lyricists